Oyuktaş can refer to:

 Oyuktaş, Kozluk
 Oyuktaş, Şenkaya